Lake Lawrence is a  lake located near Yelm in Thurston County, Washington, United States. The lake is impounded by Lake Lawrence Dam.

Lake Lawrence was named after Lindley and Sam Lawrence, businesspeople in the local logging industry. A notable glacial erratic, the Lake Lawrence erratic, abuts a county road near the lake.

References

External links
https://web.archive.org/web/20080509121323/http://www.seattleoutboard.org/lawrence.html

Lawrence
Lawrence
Tourist attractions in Thurston County, Washington